Spin and Marty is a series of television shorts that aired as part of The Mickey Mouse Club show of the mid-1950s, produced by Walt Disney and broadcast on the ABC network in the United States. There were three serials in all, set at the Triple R Ranch, a boys' western-style summer camp. The first series of 25 eleven-minute episodes, The Adventures of Spin and Marty, was filmed in 1955. Its popularity led to two sequels — The Further Adventures of Spin and Marty in 1956 and The New Adventures of Spin and Marty in 1957.

The serials were based on the 1942 novel Marty Markham by Lawrence Edward Watkin. The shows' success led to a reprinting of Watkin's novel in 1956 and the Spin and Marty comic books of the late 1950s. Spin and Marty aired as reruns on the Disney Channel until September 9, 2002. The first season's 25 episodes with bonus material were released on DVD by Disney in 2005.

Premise and major characters
The serialized Disney television adaptation of the novel starred David Stollery as the rich, orphaned Martin "Marty" Markham and Tim Considine as the poorer Spin Evans, the most athletic and popular boy at the Triple R Ranch. When the pampered Marty first arrives at the ranch in a chauffeur-driven limousine, his contemptuous dismissal of the dude ranch as a "dirty old farm" and evident fear of horses result in his ostracism by the other boys, led by Spin. By the end of the first season, however, Marty overcomes his fears and wins acceptance, becoming close friends with his erstwhile foe, Spin.  Supporting roles include Sammy Ogg as their jokester sidekick Joe Simpson, and B. G. Norman as Ambitious, Marty's first friend at the Triple R.

The cast of the second season added popular Mouseketeer Annette Funicello as Annette from the Circle H, and Kevin Corcoran as Moochie.  The third season added another Mouseketeer, Darlene Gillespie, and the program evolved into a showcase for song and dance sketches as part of a "Let's put on a show!" storyline reminiscent of Mickey Rooney–Judy Garland movies.

All three serials also had Roy Barcroft as Triple R owner Col. Logan, Harry Carey Jr. as popular counselor Bill Burnett, and J. Pat O'Malley as Perkins, Marty's butler and the Triple R's assistant cook. In the first two serials, Leonard Geer played Ollie, the wisecracking (and wise) stablehand in charge of the horses.

Production
Disney's producer was Bill Walsh and the screenplay was written by Jackson Gillis. The director was William Beaudine. Budgeted at $600,000 (equivalent to more than $5 million in ), filming for the inaugural season's episodes began at the Golden Oak Ranch in June 1955 and wrapped in September, while the juvenile cast members were on summer vacation from school. The shows' success led to Disney reprinting Watkin's novel in 1956, which is available for online viewing.

Music
The series featured a couple of songs, the "Triple R Ranch" song ("Yippee Yay, Yippee Yi, Yippee Yo"), as well as a song about "Slue-Foot Sue" ("Buckaroo"), named for Pecos Bill's tragic love story. Among the musical pieces featured in the third series was a cover of the Disney song "Nowhere in Particular" by Perkins and Sam the cook.

Remake
A TV movie focusing on updated versions of the eponymous characters, The New Adventures of Spin and Marty: Suspect Behavior, was made in 2000 for The Wonderful World of Disney, with David Gallagher and Jeremy Foley in the title roles. Bearing little resemblance to the original, it was based on the Paul Zindel novel The Undertaker's Gone Bananas. Stollery and Considine made cameo appearances.

Home media
The first season's episodes with bonus material were released on DVD by Disney on December 6, 2005, as part of The Walt Disney Treasures series. Hosted by Leonard Maltin, it includes the complete first season of 25 episodes, plus bonus features such as interviews with David Stollery, Tim Considine, and Harry Carey Jr., on the 50th anniversary year of the series' original telecasts. Maltin wrote of Considine's and Stollery's roles: "The key to the serial's success was ... Tim and David seemed genuine, and boys and girls related to them. The series may seem low-key to a modern generation raised on video games and the Internet, but it was that unhurried pace and simple storytelling that captured the hearts and imaginations of an entire generation".

Comic book

Western Publishing published comic book adventures of Spin and Marty beginning in 1956, first under Dell Comics Four Color title (#714, 767, 808, 826), then under their own title (#5-9), then in Four Color again (#1026 and 1082). The comic books continued even after the television series had ended, such as issue number 7 in September, 1958 (pictured):  Stollery and Considine, by then , are depicted on the cover in their Spin and Marty characters, as they confront danger at the Triple-R Ranch. Disney included this cover with its 2005 DVD release. Gold Key Comics later reprinted some of these stories in their titles, such as the Walt Disney Showcase comic book issue of 1975, "The Treasure of Old Fort Resolute".

Disney Legends
In October 2006, Stollery, Considine and Corcoran were all honored as Disney Legends.  Funicello had been so honored in 1992.

References

External links
 
 
 Spin and Marty History
 "Ultimate Disney" review of The Adventures of Spin and Marty DVD
 "Cinchset" filming locations and background history of the original The Spin and Marty series

1955 American television series debuts
1957 American television series endings
American Broadcasting Company original programming
Dell Comics titles
Gold Key Comics titles
Summer camps in television
Television shows adapted into comics
Television series by Disney
Television shows set in Los Angeles
The Mickey Mouse Club serials